The 2012 Missouri Valley Conference men's basketball tournament, popularly referred to as "Arch Madness", as part of the 2011-12 NCAA Division I men's basketball season was played in St. Louis, Missouri March 1–4, 2012 at the Scottrade Center. The championship game was televised live on CBS on Sunday March 4 at 1:05 pm CST. The tournament's winner received the Missouri Valley Conference's automatic bid to the 2012 NCAA tournament.

Tournament Bracket

References 

-
Missouri Valley Conference men's basketball tournament